Édouard Utudjian was a French-Armenian architect and creator of the concept "underground urbanism" in the 1930s.

biography 
He was born on November 12, 1905 in Constantinople and graduated from the University of Paris. In 1937, Utudjian had founded the International Permanent Committee of Underground Technologies and Planning to promote the usage of underground space. He was the author of the books Architecture et urbanisme souterrain (1966) and L'urbanisme souterrain.

References

Ethnic Armenian architects
Architects from Istanbul
Armenians from the Ottoman Empire
Emigrants from the Ottoman Empire to France
French people of Armenian descent
1905 births
1975 deaths
20th-century Armenian architects